Panagiotis Kharamis (born 28 January 1971) is a Greek long-distance runner. He competed in the men's marathon at the 2000 Summer Olympics.

References

1971 births
Living people
Athletes (track and field) at the 2000 Summer Olympics
Greek male long-distance runners
Greek male marathon runners
Olympic athletes of Greece
Place of birth missing (living people)